Bahnemir District is a district (bakhsh) in Babolsar County, Mazandaran Province, Iran. At the 2006 census, its population was 22,090, in 5,776 families.  The District has one city: Bahnemir. The District has two rural districts (dehestan): Azizak Rural District and Bahnemir Rural District.

References 

Babolsar County
Districts of Mazandaran Province